Jean-Christophe Cesto (born 24 January 1987 in France) is a French retired footballer.

References

French footballers
Association football defenders
SC Bastia players
Living people
1987 births
Brittany international footballers